MagicGate (MG) is a copy-protection technology introduced by Sony in 1999 as part of the Secure Digital Music Initiative (SDMI). It works by encrypting the content on the device and using MagicGate chips in both the storage device and the reader to enforce control over how files are copied.

MagicGate encryption was introduced with Sony's first digital audio players, with the related OpenMG technology being its software counterpart. Since then the encryption has been rolled out to other Sony devices - it is used in the memory cards of the PlayStation 2 and, has been introduced into all of Sony's Memory Stick products. Some devices will only accept Memory Sticks which use MagicGate technology.

All Memory Stick Duo cards equipped with MagicGate can be identified by a notch located on the rear end of the card.

Support 
Few (USB or PC Card) Memory Stick-compatible card readers support secure MagicGate. Although manufacturers list Memory Stick Pro/Pro Duo (MG) compatibility, where MG means MagicGate, they may not support the security portion of MagicGate. This becomes important when purchasing a card reader/writer for use with SonicStage and Sony CONNECT as even Sony itself does not fully support MagicGate on certain readers. Non-MagicGate memory card reader/writers do not show up in SonicStage, with the notable exception of Sony Ericsson phones.

Current Sony devices that support MagicGate DRM as of summer 2007:
 Most Memory Stick capable Sony VAIO notebooks and desktops
 PlayStation Portable – The PlayStation Portable in service mode will only boot to Memory Sticks with MagicGate enabled
 PlayStation Vita - Used for verifying memory cards and PSP Emulation.
 PlayStation 4
 PlayStation 3
 MSAC-US40 USB Memory Stick Card Reader/Writer.
 PlayStation 2

Current Sony Devices that do not support MagicGate DRM as of summer 2007:
 All U.S. Sony Ericsson phones – most Sony Ericsson phones should show up in SonicStage for MP3/AAC transfer
 VGP-MCA10 PCMCIA Card Reader/Writer – does not sport the MagicGate logo
 Sony 17 in 1 Card Reader/Writer MRW62E/S1/181
 Sony AVCHD camcorders such as HDR-UX5/UX7

Current Sony Devices that do not support MagicGate DRM as of summer 2007, but the support may be possible via future firmware updates:
 Mylo Personal Communicator – Mylo's 1GB internal memory can be used with SonicStage and supports OpenMG
 Sony Reader portable e-reader PRS-500 & PRS-600 – may show up in SonicStage for MP3/AAC transfer.

State of DRM 
In March 2009, Sony Electronics announced they were phasing out the Sony CONNECT service in favor of Windows Media Audio & Windows Media DRM, though they have not officially announced plans to continue a Windows Media DRM music service, either. As of June 2009, the future of MagicGate DRM was unknown. MagicGate slots were still a part of the default Vaio configuration as of May 2010.

See also 
 Memory Stick
 OpenMG
 Memory Stick PRO
 SonicStage
 Handycam
 Cyber-shot

References 

Digital rights management systems